Carmen Amedori (born 1955) is an American journalist and politician. She was elected in 1998 to the Maryland House of Delegates for District 5A, from Carroll County.  After being re-elected in 2002 she served in the Maryland General Assembly until 2004, when she was appointed by Governor Bob Ehrlich to the state Parole Commission where she served until 2009. Carmen is a background actor and has had a featured extra role on House of Cards and also has played the lead in productions with Siren's Media. She is a writer and a licensed realtor.

Early life and education
Carmen M. Amedori was born in 1955 in Maryland to an Italian family. She attended parochial and public schools. She graduated in 1977 from Stevenson University (then Villa Julie College). She also attended the Notre Dame of Maryland University.

Career
Amedori worked as a paralegal for many years before becoming a journalist. She wrote for The Baltimore Sun, the Carroll County Times and Ocean City Today.  Among other awards, she received the Distinguished Journalism Award from the Society of Professional Journalists.

She was appointed as a district court commissioner for Carroll County District 10, serving from 1991 to 1993. Amedori is a member of the Maryland Taxpayers' Association, the National Association of Legal Assistance, Citizens Against Government Waste, Citizens Against Big Charter Government, and Americans for Tax Reform. In 1998 she was serving as chairperson of the Carroll County Charter Board which she later led the charge to defeat.

Amedori was elected twice to the Maryland House of Delegates (1998 and 2002).  While in the State House she served on the House Judiciary Committee, where she was ranking member in 2004.  She also had the distinction of serving as assistant minority leader, as well as a minority whip.

In June 2004, the governor appointed her to a six-year term on the Maryland Parole Commission. In February 2010, Amedori announced her candidacy for US Senator, running against incumbent senator Barbara Mikulski, who has served for many years.  Amedori dropped her bid for the Senate on April 16, 2010, announcing she would run for the office of Lieutenant Governor of Maryland, on the Republican Party ticket with Maryland gubernatorial candidate Brian Murphy.

Two weeks later Amedori left the Murphy ticket, endorsing former Maryland Governor Bob Ehrlich, Murphy's opponent in the Republican primary. She argued that Ehrlich had the best chance to beat current Maryland Governor Martin O'Malley in the general election. She said, "If there was going to be a loss to O'Malley, let it be Bob's loss."

That year Amedori moved from Carroll County to Maryland's Lower Eastern Shore to be with her 89-year-old Father. On 14 Sept 2010, Amedori was elected to the Worcester County Republican Central Committee.  She also served as Campaign Manager to a conservative candidate for the House of Delegates in State District 38B.  Carmen returned to Carroll County in October 2013 where she has been a resident for 32 years and in the City of Westminster where she has been a homeowner for 14 years.

Legislative notes
Sponsored Parental Notification and Judicial-bypass legislation
Pro-Second Amendment, lead sponsor on CCW bills, as well as right to protect property legislation
Fiscal Conservative

Election results
2002 Race for Maryland House of Delegates – District 5A
Voters to choose two:
{| class="wikitable"
|-
!Name
!Votes
!Percent
!Outcome
|-
|Carmen Amedori, Rep.
|19,195
|  34.0%
|   Won
|-
|Nancy R. Stocksdale, Rep.
|20,480
|  36.3%
|   Won
|-
|Kimberly J. Petry, Dem.
|6,195
|  11.0%
|   Lost
|-
|Robert P. Wack, Dem.
|10,520
|  18.6%
|   Lost
|-
|Other Write-Ins
|49
|  0.1%
|   Lost
|}

1998 Race for Maryland House of Delegates – District 5A
Voters to choose three:
{| class="wikitable"
|-
!Name
!Votes
!Percent
!Outcome
|-
|Carmen Amedori, Rep.
|21,969
|  24%
|   Won
|-
|Nancy R. Stocksdale, Rep.
|27,665
|  30%
|   Won
|-
|Joseph M. Getty, Rep.
|25,114
|  27%
|   Won
|-
|Ellen Willis Miller, Dem.
|16,735
|  18%
|   Lost
|}

Personal life
In 1977, Amedori married Robert DePaola; they had two daughters together, After some years, they divorced. Amedori later married attorney Jerry F. Barnes, who then became State's Attorney in Carroll County Maryland. Carmen is now remarried to Timothy Headley of Westminster, Maryland.

Honors and awards
School Bell Award, Maryland State Teachers' Association, 1988 (sustained coverage)
1989 (spot news). Distinguished Journalism Award, Society of Professional Journalists
Sigma Delta Chi, Maryland Chapter, 1989. 
Honorable Mention, Features Award, Maryland-Delaware-DC Press Association, 1989

References

External links
Carmen M. Amedori (Maryland State Archives)

1955 births
Living people
People from Carroll County, Maryland
American newspaper reporters and correspondents
Republican Party members of the Maryland House of Delegates
Women state legislators in Maryland
Place of birth missing (living people)
American women journalists
People from Worcester County, Maryland
20th-century American politicians
20th-century American women politicians
21st-century American politicians
21st-century American women politicians
Stevenson University alumni
Notre Dame of Maryland University alumni